The 1964 Ball State Cardinals football team was an American football team that represented Ball State College (later renamed Ball State University) in the Indiana Collegiate Conference (ICC) during the 1964 NCAA College Division football season. In its third season under head coach Ray Louthen, the team compiled a 5–3 record (4–2 against ICC opponents) and finished in an unprecedented five-way tie for the ICC championship.

Schedule

References

Ball State
Ball State Cardinals football seasons
Ball State Cardinals football